Sex Professionals of Canada (SPOC) is a Canadian activism group. SPOC was formed in 1983 and campaigns through public education and legal challenges to decriminalize Canadian prostitution laws.

History
Founded in 1983, SPOC has developed into a volunteer activist organization that is entirely run by sex workers. The organization stands "for the decriminalization of all forms of sex work in Canada" and relies on donations for financial support.

According to the SPOC website, the organization's mission and principles are listed as:

SPOC is a volunteer-run activist network that engages in advocacy and education.
SPOC operates on the principle that all forms of consensual adult sex work are valid occupations.
SPOC maintains that sex workers have the capacity for choice and our experiences are diverse.
SPOC maintains that sex workers deserve labour rights, and occupational health and safety standards defined by sex workers themselves.
SPOC members and associates oppose those who seek to ‘rescue’ sex workers using force or coercive measures including court imposed re-education/exit programs, jails or camps.

Key people
The organization's executive director is Amy Lebovitch; its deputy director is Eve Anderson; SPOC's "Exec-at-Large" is Julie Grant; and Valerie Scott is the Legal Co-ordinator.

Bedford v. Canada
On March 20, 2007, Valerie Scott, Amy Lebovitch and Terri-Jean Bedford initiated an application (Bedford v. Canada) in the Ontario Superior Court of Justice seeking the constitutional invalidation of s.210 (bawdy house), s.212(1)(j) (living on the avails) and s.213(1)(c) (communicating for the purpose of prostitution) of the Criminal Code.

References

External links 
Sex Professionals of Canada
 Print, video and audio media interviews with SPOC members. 2004 to present.

1983 establishments in Canada
Sex worker organizations in Canada
Political advocacy groups in Canada